1966 college football season may refer to:

 1966 NCAA University Division football season
 1966 NCAA College Division football season
 1966 NAIA football season